Jelitki  (from 1938-45 Gelitten) is a village in the administrative district of Gmina Wieliczki, within Olecko County, Warmian-Masurian Voivodeship, in northern Poland.

From 1975-1998, the village belonged to Suwałki County in Poland before being a part of Olecko County.

References

Jelitki